Cham Deylavand-e Olya (also Romanized as Cham Deylāvand-e ‘Olyā; also known as Deylāvand-e ‘Olyā) is a village in Darb-e Gonbad Rural District, Darb-e Gonbad District, Kuhdasht County, Lorestan Province, Iran. At the 2006 census, its population was 330, in 66 families.

References 

Towns and villages in Kuhdasht County